Samuel Tucker (1721–1789) was an American colonial politician who served as a Freeholder in Hunterdon County, New Jersey during the colonial period, and later as President and Treasurer of the Provincial Congress of New Jersey during the American Revolutionary War. During this period, the colony converted to an independent state in 1776 after the ouster of Royal Governor William Franklin and the election of the independent state's first governor, William Livingston.

See also
 List of colonial governors of New Jersey

References

1721 births
1789 deaths
Provincial Congress of New Jersey
People of colonial New Jersey
People of New Jersey in the American Revolution
Politicians from Hunterdon County, New Jersey